The Torpedo Division originally called the Gunnery and Torpedo Division was a naval staff organisation of the British Admiralty Naval Staff established in 1920 when the functions of the Gunnery and Torpedo Division was divided up into separate functions. It existed until 1928 when it was absorbed into the Tactical Division.

History
The Torpedo Division was created in 1920 when the role of the Gunnery and Torpedo Division of the Naval Staff was separated into two distinct divisions. Rear-Admiral Arthur Kipling Waistell assumed office on 6 April 1920 he remained in the post until April 1922 when he appointed Rear-Admiral (D), Commanding Destroyer Flotillas Atlantic Fleet. It continued to operate until 1928 when it was amalgamated into the Tactical Division. The division was administered by the Director of the Torpedo Division who in turn was supported by a deputy director.

Director of the Torpedo Division
Included:
 Rear-Admiral Arthur K. Waistell: April 1920 – April 1922 
 Captain Stanley L. Willis: April 1922 – August 1924 
 Captain Norton A. Sulivan: August 1924 – July 1926 
 Captain Cyril St.C. Cameron: July 1926 – June 1928 
 Captain Henry G. Thursfield: June–December 1928

Deputy Director of the Torpedo Division
Included:
 Captain Gilbert O. Stephenson: April 1920 – March 1921 
 Captain Frederick E.E.G. Schreiber: March 1921 – April 1922

Citations

Sources
 Friedman, Norman (2011). British Cruisers: Two World Wars and After. Barnsley, England: Seaforth Publishing. .  
 Mackie, Colin (2019). "Royal Navy Senior Appointments" (PDF). gulabin.com. C. Mackie.
 Parkinson, Jonathan (2018). The Royal Navy, China Station: 1864 - 1941: As seen through the lives of the Commanders in Chief. Leicester, United Kingdom: Troubador Publishing Ltd. .

Admiralty departments
Military units and formations established in 1920
Military units and formations disestablished in 1928